The 2014 FILA Wrestling World Cup - Women's freestyle was the second of a set of three FILA Wrestling World Cups in 2014 - one for each major discipline. The event took place in Tokyo, Japan on March 15 and 16, 2014.

Final standings
1. 
2. 
3. 
4. 
5. 
6. 
7. 
8.

See also 
2014 FILA Wrestling World Cup - Men's freestyle
2014 FILA Wrestling World Cup - Men's Greco-Roman

References 

FILA Wrestling World Cup - Women's freestyle
FILA Wrestling World Cup - Women's freestyle
International wrestling competitions hosted by Japan
World
FILA Wrestling World Cup - Women's freestyle